Jack Lester may refer to:

Jack Lester, football player
Jack Lester (boxer), American heavyweight boxer
Jack Lester (actor) in The Flight of Dragons

See also
John Lester (disambiguation)
Jack Lester King